Disintegrin and metalloproteinase domain-containing protein 28 is an enzyme that in humans is encoded by the ADAM28 gene.

This gene encodes a member of the ADAM (a disintegrin and metalloprotease domain) family. Members of this family are membrane-anchored proteins structurally related to snake venom disintegrins, and have been implicated in a variety of biological processes involving cell–cell and cell–matrix interactions, including fertilization, muscle development, and neurogenesis. The protein encoded by this gene is a lymphocyte-expressed ADAM protein. Alternative splicing results in two transcript variants. The shorter version encodes a secreted isoform, while the longer version encodes a transmembrane isoform.

References

Further reading

External links
 The MEROPS online database for peptidases and their inhibitors: M12.224
 

Proteases
Human proteins
EC 3.4.24